O'tôrgs-Kaisa Abrahamsson (Hälsingland)
Hasse Alatalo (Norrbotten)
Kalle Almlöf (Dalarna)
Leif Alpsjö
Benny Andersson
Erik Ask-Uppmark
Styrbjörn Bergelt (Uppland)
Pelle Björnlert (Östergötland)
Ola Bäckström (Dalarna)
Mats Edén
Anna Elwing (Halland)
Erik Englund (Jämtland)
Kjell-Erik Eriksson
Ulf Gruvberg
Per Gudmundson (Dalarna)
Einar Hansander (Dalsland)
Johan Hedin
Merit Hemmingson
Ole Hjort
Emma Härdelin (Jämtland and Hälsingland)
Sven Härdelin (Hälsingland)
Thore Härdelin (Hälsingland)
Peter "Puma" Hedlund (Uppland)
Pehr Hörberg (Småland)
Bo Isaksson "Bo i Ransätt" (Värmland)
Åsa Jinder (Uppland)
Olov Johansson
Sofia Karlsson
Roland Keijser
Hans Kennemark (Västergötland)
Carin Kjellman
Gudmunds Nils Larsson (Dalarna)
Anders Liljefors (Uppland)
Svante Lindqvist (Norrbotten)
Bengt Lindroth (Värmland)
Bengt Löfberg (Småland)
Dan "Gisen" Malmquist
Mikael Marin
Hållbus Totte Mattson
Kalle Moraeus (Dalarna)
Ale Möller
Kungs Levi Nilsson (Dalarna)
Carina Normansson (Dalarna)
Anders Norudde
Hjort Anders Olsson (Dalarna)
Pers Hans Olsson
Eric Öst (1906–1984)
Jon-Erik Öst (1885–1968)
Anders Rosén (Dalarna)
Susanne Rosenberg
Sture Sahlström (Uppland)
Jonny Soling
Göran Sjölén (Medelpad)
Marie Stensby (Bohuslän)
Leif Stinnerbom
Björn Ståbi (Dalarna)
August Strömberg (Småland)
Janne Strömstedt
Ulf Störling (Hälsingland)
Roger Tallroth
Karin Wallin (Skåne)
Ale Carr (Skåne)
Evert Wernberg (Medelpad)
Werner Wernberg (Medelpad)
Mats Wester
Bertil Westling (Hälsingland)
Hugo Westling (Hälsingland)
Lena Willemark (Dalarna)
Tony Wretling (Gästrikland)

Folk music groups

 Alwa (folk music group)
 Arbete och Fritid
 Avadå Band
 Bazar Blå
Boot
Bäsk
Den Fule
Filarfolket
Folk och Rackare
Francis
Frifot
Garmarna
Gjallarhorn (Finlands-Svensk)
Groupa
Harv
Hedningarna
Horn Please!
Hoven Droven
Kebnekajse
Kongero
Ni:d
Nordanstigs spelmanslag
Nordman
Norrlåtar (Norrbotten)
Norrtelje Elitkapell (Uppland)
Nyckelharporkestern
JP Nyströms
Ranarim
Rosenbergs Sjua
Sarek
Skäggmanslaget (Hälsingland)
Swåp
Triakel
Väsen
Dreamers' Circus

Gjallarhorn (Ostrobothia, Finland)

Folk musicians